This is a list of largest publicly traded companies on Colombo Stock Exchange by market capitalisation in Sri Lanka. Only the top 50 companies are listed below.

List 
These 50 companies alone account for about 75% of the total market capitalisation of the Colombo Stock Exchange. On January 4, 2021, total market capitalisation crossed three trillion rupees mark for the first time. Hayleys announced a stock split on January 21 of 2021 and it resulted in increasing market capitalization by over 100 billion rupees. All share price index surpassed 8000 points for the first as a result.

Source: Colombo Stock Exchange, 8 January 2023

See also
 List of public corporations by market capitalization

References

Public corporations by market capitalization
Public corporations by market capitalization